Pavel Sergeevič Gromyko (born May 24, 1989), is a Russian professional basketball player who currently plays for the Ufimets Ufa of the Russian Superleague 2.

Playing career 
Gromyko started his career with Dynamo Saint Petersburg. He spent one year playing for Serbian team Crvena zvezda. He also played for domestic teams Khimki, Enisey and Dynamo Moscow.

In 2016, he signed for Yaroslavl-based Burevestnik of the 3rd-tier Russian Superleague 2. In 2017, he joined Ufimets from Ufa.

International career 
Gromyko was a member of the Russia U-16 national basketball team that won a silver medal at the 2004 FIBA Europe Under-16 Championship. Over eight tournament games, he averaged 15.2 points, 8.2 rebounds and 0.6 assists per game. He also was a member of the under-16 team that competed at the 2005 FIBA Europe Under-16 Championship. Over eight tournament games, he averaged 23.6 points, 14.5 rebounds and 0.6 assists per game. He also represented Russian U18 team at the 2006 FIBA Europe Under-18 Championship.

References

External links
Player Profile at realgm.com
Profile at basketball-reference.com
Player Profile at eurobasket.com

1989 births
Living people
ABA League players
BC Dynamo Moscow players
BC Dynamo Saint Petersburg players
BC Enisey players
BC Spartak Primorye players
KK Crvena zvezda players
Russian expatriate basketball people in Serbia
Russian men's basketball players
Basketball players from Moscow
Small forwards